Wilburton station is a future Link light rail station in Bellevue, Washington, 
on Sound Transit's East Link Extension. The elevated station, expected to open in 2024, will serve the area immediately east of Downtown Bellevue, including Lake Bellevue and the Overlake Hospital Medical Center.

Location

Wilburton station will be located along the BNSF Woodinville Subdivision corridor, north of NE 8th Street and east of 116th Avenue Northeast. The Overlake Hospital Medical Center campus, part of the city's "hospital district", is to the northwest of the station, along Interstate 405. The area's land use consists predominantly of low-rise commercial and office spaces, with multifamily residential on the eastern fringes.

The Overlake Hospital Medical Center area is currently served by the RapidRide B Line and other King County Metro bus routes.

History
The passage of Sound Transit 2 in 2008 funded the East Link light rail project, including the construction of a station near the Overlake Hospital Medical Center campus. The station was proposed as a potential interim terminus for a truncated line between Seattle and Bellevue, in the event of a smaller package than the one that was passed by voters. The project's preferred alternative, adopted in 2009, placed an elevated station along NE 12th Street to the east of Interstate 405, just north of the hospital campus. In 2010, the City of Bellevue requested a tunneled alignment for the light rail line through its downtown, which shifted the station to the BNSF alignment north of NE 8th Street.

In 2015, the station's temporary working name of "Hospital" was replaced with "Wilburton", its permanent name. Construction on the station and approach structures began in 2017.

Station layout

Wilburton station will consist of a single island platform situated above street level on the north side of NE 8th Street. At street level, the station will have two sets of stairs, escalators and elevators leading to the platform, as well as ticket vending machines and rider information. On the east side of the station will be a small kiss and ride facility, as well as covered bicycle parking. At the north end of the station will be a pedestrian pathway crossing over Sturtevant Creek (a tributary of Kelsey Creek), heading towards the future Eastside Rail Corridor trail and Overlake Hospital Medical Center.

A second pedestrian bridge, connecting both sides of NE 8th Street, is planned to be completed in 2023 by the city government.

References

External links

Future Link light rail stations
Link light rail stations in King County, Washington
Buildings and structures in Bellevue, Washington
Railway stations scheduled to open in 2024